The 2007 season of Baltic League (known as the TrioBet Baltic League for sponsorship reasons) was the first edition of the Baltic League. The competition was won by Liepājas Metalurgs of Latvia, who beat fellow Latvians FK Ventspils 8–2 on aggregate in the final, which was spread over two legs on 8 November 2007 and 11 November 2007.

Group stage

Group A

Group B

Group C

Group D

Knockout stage

Bracket

Quarter-finals

FBK Kaunas won 10–2 on aggregate.

Ekranas won 2–1 on aggregate.

FK Ventspils won 4–2 on aggregate.

Liepājas Metalurgs won 5–3 on aggregate.

Semi-finals

FK Ventspils won 1–0 on aggregate.

Liepājas Metalurgs won 8–3 on aggregate.

Final

Liepājas Metalurgs won 8–2 on aggregate.

2007 Baltic League Player Awards 

Goalkeeper of the Year:  Mihkel Aksalu ( FC Flora)
Defender of the Year: 
Midfielder of the Year: 
Forward of the Year: 
Young Footballer of the Year:

Goalscorers
10 goals
  Ģirts Karlsons

5 goals
  Ričardas Beniušis
  Genādijs Soloņicins

4 goals
  Mindaugas Kalonas
  Serhiy Sernetskyi

3 goals

  Aleksandr Dubõkin
  Mindaugas Grigalevičius
  Artur Ossipov
  Vīts Rimkus
  Egidijus Varnas

2 goals

  Antonio Ferreira
  Rafael Gaúcho
  Tarmo Kink
  Severino Lima de Maura
  Dmitry Lipartov
  Nikolaj Misiuk
  Dainius Saulėnas
  Aleksejs Višņakovs
  Indrek Zelinski

1 goal

  Vitālijs Astafjevs
  Aleksandrs Cauņa
  Marius Činikas
  Marián Dirnbach
  Viktors Dobrecovs
  Kristaps Grebis
  Maksim Gruznov
  Deniss Ivanovs
  Algis Jankauskas
  Enver Jääger
  Gatis Kalniņš
  Vladimirs Kamešs
  Sergei Kazakov
  Oskars Kļava
  Vladimirs Koļesņičenko
  Oliver Konsa
  Audrius Kšanavičius
  Aleksandr Kulatšenko
  Givi Kvaratskhelia
  Virmantas Lemežis
  Edvinas Lukoševičius
  Povilas Lukšys
  Dejan Milošeski
  Igoris Morinas
  Adrian Mrowiec
  Aleksandr Mysikov
  Andrejs Perepļotkins
  Jozef Piaček
  Eimantas Poderis
  Artūras Rimkevičius
  Nerijus Sasnauskas
  Igors Savčenkovs
  Mantas Savėnas
  Igors Sļesarčuks
  Aleksejs Soleičuks
  Vitalis Stankevičius
  Darvydas Šernas
  Andrius Šidlauskas
  Giedrius Tomkevičius
  Cristián Torres
  Sergei Zangareev

Own goals
  Liivo Leetma 
  Serghei Pogreban
  Alfredas Skroblas

References

External links
 
 Match reports at Estonian Football Association

2007
2007 in Estonian football
2007 in Latvian football
2007 in Lithuanian football